FBC Kalmarsund, up to 2011 known as Färjestadens IBK, is a Swedish floorball team, from Färjestaden, Öland, that plays in the Swedish Division 1 South. In the 2007–08 season, they played in Swedish Super League, the highest league of Swedish floorball. They ended last and were relegated to Division 1 South for the 2008–2009 season.
They now play in the Swedish Super League again.

History
The club was founded by a couple of friends in 1990. In 1998, FIBK men's team played in the Swedish Division 5. Eight years later in 2006–07,. the club won their Division 1 group and qualified for Swedish Super League during the 2007–08 season. The club became Öland's first Elitserien club in any ball game. In their first ever super league game, they lost with 2-5 against the then reigning Swedish Champions Warberg IC. Their youth teams have also enjoyed success. The Boys-16 team won SM (the Swedish championship) in 2003 and 2004. In the  2006–07 season, they won Juniorallsvenskan, JAS.

References

External links
FBC Kalmarsund's official website
Färjestadens IBK's official website

Swedish floorball teams
1990 establishments in Sweden
Sports clubs established in 1990